Champneys-English Harbour is a designated place in the Canadian province of Newfoundland and Labrador.

Geography 
Champneys-English Harbour is in Newfoundland within Subdivision J of Division No. 7.

Demographics 

See also 
List of communities in Newfoundland and Labrador
List of designated places in Newfoundland and Labrador

References 

Designated places in Newfoundland and Labrador